Felix Cheong is a Singaporean author and poet.

Cheong has written two young adult fiction books used as part of a national education campaign – The Call From Crying House and its sequel, The Woman In The Last Carriage.

Cheong's first collection of poetry, Temptation and Other Poems was published in 1998 followed by a second collection in 1999, I Watch the Stars Go Out, Broken by the Rain in 2003, and Sudden in Youth: New and Selected Poems in 2009.

Cheong won the National Arts Council's Young Artist of the Year for Literature Award in 2000 and the poetry slam at the Hong Kong International Literary Festival in 2004.

His more recent writing such as in the Singapore Siu Dai series has included more social and political commentary.

Works
B-SIDES AND BACKSLIDES: 1986 -2018 (2018, Math Paper Press) 
Singapore Siu Dai 2: The SG Conversation Upsize! (2014, Ethos Books) 
 Singapore Siu Dai: The SG Conversation In A Cup (2014, Ethos Books) 
 Vanishing Point (2012, Ethos Books) 
 Sudden in Youth: New & Selected Poems (2009, Ethos Books) 
 The Woman in the Last Carriage (2007, Landmark Books) 
 The Call from the Crying House (2006, Landmark Books) 
 Different (2005, Ethos Books) 
 Idea to Ideal: 12 Singapore Poets on the Writing of their Poems (editor; 2004, Firstfruits) 
 Broken by the Rain (2003, Firstfruits) 
 I Watch the Stars Go Out (1999, Ethos Books) 
 Temptation, and Other Poems (1998, Landmark Books)

References

External links

Living people
Singaporean poets
Singaporean people of Chinese descent
Year of birth missing (living people)